The European Convention on the International Classification of Patents for Invention was signed on December 19, 1954, in Paris, France, by members of the Council of Europe. It entered into force on August 1, 1955, and it was denounced by all Parties and ceased to be in force as from February 18, 1999. The Convention created the International Classification of Patents for Invention. The Convention is written in English and French, both texts being equally authoritative.

The Convention, along with the European Convention relating to the Formalities required for Patent Applications of 1953, resulted from the work of the Council of Europe's Committee of Experts in patent matters in the early 1950s.

See also 
 List of Council of Europe treaties
 Strasbourg Agreement Concerning the International Patent Classification of March 24, 1971
 International Patent Classification

References

External links 
 Archived page on the Council of Europe web site 
 Official text (.doc)
 Official text (.htm)

Patent classifications
Treaties concluded in 1954
Treaties entered into force in 1955
Council of Europe treaties
Patent law treaties